Abaddon Books is a British publishing imprint, founded in 2006. It is part of the Rebellion group of companies, along with publishing companies Solaris Books, 2000 AD, 2000 AD Graphic Novels, and Cubicle 7.

Abaddon publishes "shared world" novels in the horror, science fiction and fantasy genres. Describing itself as a return to "the good old days of pulp fiction", the imprint focuses on shorter, action-driven novels with dark or horrific themes.

The line was founded by Jonathan Oliver, who has been Editor-in-Chief of Abaddon and Solaris Books since Rebellion bought the latter from BL Publishing in 2009.

Shared-world series

Abaddon publishes "shared-world" novels set in a number of narrative settings, with two or more authors writing in each series. Abaddon's editorial team creates the worlds in collaboration with the authors, placing an emphasis on original and engaging ideas:

The imprint is currently publishing books in six series:
 The Afterblight Chronicles, a post-apocalyptic setting in which cults and warlords run rampant over the survivors of a global plague.
 The Infernal Game, an espionage series incorporating elements of urban fantasy and gothic horror.
 No Man's World, an exploration story about a company of World War I soldiers inexplicably transported to an alien world.
 Pax Britannia, a steampunk alternate history in which a 160-year-old Queen Victoria still governs the British Empire towards the end of the twentieth century.
 Tomes of the Dead, not a single shared world, but a series of stand-alone zombie stories marked by subversion or reinterpretation of the genre.
 Twilight of Kerberos, a "sword and sorcery" setting on a small world orbiting the gas giant Kerberos, inhabited by the remnants of lost civilizations.

A seventh series was announced in 2010:
 Malory's Knights of Albion, a series of Arthurian stories supposedly drawn from Thomas Malory's unpublished sequel to Le Morte D'Arthur.

A further two series were launched in the imprint's first year, but have since ceased:
 Dreams of Inan, a science fantasy series set on a futuristic world in which magic acts as a nuclear-style deterrent. The series concluded with The Worm That Wasn't in 2007.
 Sniper Elite, an alternate history based in the world of the Sniper Elite games. The series included only a single book, The Spear of Destiny, in 2006.

Publications

The following titles have been previously published or are announced as upcoming.

All releases prior to 2009, and most releases since, have featured cover art by Greg Staples or Mark Harrison; covers for the new The Infernal Game and No Man's World titles, and for the upcoming omnibus editions, have been created by 2000 AD staff designers Simon Parr and Luke Preece.

The Afterblight Chronicles

Novels
 
 
 
 
 
 
 
 
  UK-, US-.
  UK-, US-.

Omnibus collections
  Includes: Orbital Decay, Dead Kelly, and The Bloody Deluge.
  Includes: The Culled, Kill or Cure, and Death Got No Mercy.

The Infernal Game
 Cold Warriors (Rebecca Levene, February 2010, UK-, US-)
 Ghost Dance (Rebecca Levene, August 2010, UK-, US-)

No Man's World
 Black Hand Gang (Pat Kelleher, February 2010, UK-, US-)

Pax Britannia
 Unnatural History (Jonathan Green, February 2007)
 El Sombra (Al Ewing, June 2007)
 Leviathan Rising (Jonathan Green, March 2008)
 Human Nature (Jonathan Green, December 2008)
 Evolution Expects (Jonathan Green, May 2009)
 Blood Royal (Jonathan Green, August 2010 UK-, US-)
 Gods of Manhattan (Al Ewing September 2010, UK-, US-)
 Dark Side (Jonathan Green, September 2011, UK-, US-)
 The Quicksilver Omnibus, Volume 1 (Jonathan Green, May 2011, UK-, US-)
 Pax Omega (Al Ewing, April 2012)

Tomes of the Dead
 Death Hulk (Matthew Sprange, August 2006)
 The Words of Their Roaring (Matthew Smith, May 2007)
 The Devil's Plague (Mark Beynon, October 2007)
 I, Zombie (Al Ewing, June 2008)
 Anno Mortis (Rebecca Levene, November 2008)
 Way of the Barefoot Zombie (Jasper Bark, June 2009)
 Tide of Souls (Simon Bestwick, July 2009)
 Hungry Hearts (Gary McMahon, November 2009)
 Empire of Salt (Weston Ochse, April 2010)
 Stronghold (Paul Finch, August 2010)
 The Best of Tomes of the Dead, Volume 1 (Matthew Smith, Al Ewing and Rebecca Levene, Date TBC, UK-, US-)
 The Viking Dead (Toby Venables, Date TBC, UK-, US-)

Twilight of Kerberos
Shadowmage (Matthew Sprange, February 2008)
The Clockwork King of Orl (Mike Wild, August 2008)
The Light of Heaven (David A. McIntee, February 2009)
The Crucible of the Dragon God (Mike Wild, June 2009)
The Call of Kerberos (Jonathan Oliver, October 2009)
Night's Haunting (Matthew Sprange, October 2009)
Engines of the Apocalypse (Mike Wild, August 2010, UK-, US-)
The Trials of Trass Kathra (Mike Wild, Date TBC, UK-, US-)
The Wrath of Kerberos (Jonathan Oliver, Date TBC, ISBN TBC)

Malory's Knights of Albion
 The Black Chalice (Steven Savile, Date TBC, UK-, US-)
 The Savage Knight (Paul Lewis, Date TBC, UK-, US-)
 Dark North (Paul Finch March 2012 )

Dreams of Inan
 A Kind of Peace (Andy Boot, August 2006)
 Stealing Life (Antony Johnston, January 2007)
 The Worm That Wasn't (Mike Maddox, December 2007)

Sniper Elite
 Sniper Elite: The Spear of Destiny (Jasper Bark, August 2006)

Judges
 The Avalanche (Michael Carroll, May 2018)
 When the Light Lay Still (Charles J. Eskew, August 2018)
 Lone Wolf (George Mann, September 2018)

Other media

Films
In October 2010, Amber Entertainment announced that it had optioned the movie rights for Tomes of the Dead: Stronghold (2010), to be produced by Amber's Ileen Maisel and directed by Rebellion's Jason Kingsley.

References

External links
Official Home Page
The Official Abaddon Books Blog

Rebellion Developments
Book publishing companies of the United Kingdom
Publishing companies established in 2006
Companies based in Oxford
2006 establishments in England